Pudiyangum Kesavadasan Krishna kumar, known as P Krishna kumar, (born 1 January 1974) plays for the [[Rajasthan cricket team in domestic cricket.

Krishnakumar played first-class cricket for Rajasthan Ranji team for sixteen years, five as captain.

Awards and honour
 Awarded "Best Cricketer of Rajasthan" award from Sir Mathura Das Mathur Trust, Rajasthan in 1995.

References

1974 births
Rajasthan cricketers
Living people
Cricketers from Palakkad
Indian cricketers